Blencoe is a city in Monona County, Iowa, United States. The population was 233 at the 2020 census.

An early settler from Blencoe, Canada, named the town.

Geography
Blencoe is located at  (41.931871, -96.081742).

Demographics

2010 census
As of the census of 2010, there were 224 people, 99 households, and 70 families living in the city. The racial makeup of the city was 96.9% White, 0.4% Native American, 0.4% Asian, and 2.2% from two or more races. Hispanic or Latino of any race were 0.4% of the population.

There were 99 households, of which 23.2% had children under the age of 18 living with them, 48.5% were married couples living together, 16.2% had a female householder with no husband present, 6.1% had a male householder with no wife present, and 29.3% were non-families. 25.3% of all households were made up of individuals, and 8.1% had someone living alone who was 65 years of age or older. The average household size was 2.26 and the average family size was 2.63.

The median age in the city was 49.7 years. 18.7% of residents were under the age of 18; 7.7% were between the ages of 18 and 24; 19.3% were from 25 to 44; 30.8% were from 45 to 64; and 23.7% were 65 years of age or older. The gender makeup of the city was 46.4% male and 53.6% female.

2000 census
As of the census of 2000, there were 231 people, 110 households, and 68 families living in the city. The racial makeup of the city was 99.13% White, and 0.87% from two or more races.

There were 110 households, out of which 21.8% had children under the age of 18 living with them, 53.6% were married couples living together, 6.4% had a female householder with no husband present, and 37.3% were non-families. 35.5% of all households were made up of individuals, and 24.5% had someone living alone who was 65 years of age or older. The average household size was 2.10 and the average family size was 2.71.

In the city, the population was spread out, with 19.9% under the age of 18, 4.3% from 18 to 24, 16.0% from 25 to 44, 25.5% from 45 to 64, and 34.2% who were 65 years of age or older. The median age was 50 years. For every 100 females, there were 86.3 males. For every 100 females age 18 and over, there were 85.0 males.

The median income for a household in the city was $25,556, and the median income for a family was $40,833. Males had a median income of $35,250 versus $18,438 for females. The per capita income for the city was $13,841. About 4.7% of families and 7.6% of the population were below the poverty line, including 12.9% of those under the age of eighteen and 2.5% of those 65 or over.

Education
West Monona Community School District operates public schools serving the community.

References

Cities in Iowa
Cities in Monona County, Iowa